Japanese oak is a common name for several species of plants and may refer to:

Lithocarpus glaber, found in Japan, China, and Taiwan
Quercus mongolica subsp. crispula